Javad Mojtahed Shabestari is an Iranian Shiite cleric and politician. He is a member of the 5th Assembly of Experts from the West Azerbaijan electorate. Mojtahed Shabestari won his membership with 247,240 votes. His father Mohsen Mojtahed Shabestari was member of the Assembly of Experts from the East Azerbaijan.

References

People from West Azerbaijan Province
Members of the Assembly of Experts
Living people
1966 births